The Dahije or Dahijas were the renegade Janissary officers who took power in the Sanjak of Smederevo (also known as the Belgrade Pashaluk), after murdering the Vizier Hadži Mustafa Pasha of Belgrade on 15 December 1801. The four supreme dahije leaders were Kučuk Alija, Aganlija, Mula Jusuf and Mehmed-aga Fočić. Rebels against the Ottoman sultan, they were defeated by the Serbs in the initial phase of the First Serbian Uprising, which is also called "Uprising against the Dahije" (Буна против дахија / Buna protiv dahija).

Name
The renegade janissary leaders were called dahije, from Ottoman Turkish dayı, meaning "uncle". The lesser janissary commanders were called kabadahije (s. kabadahija), referring to the Turkish phrase "kabadayı", a colloquial phrase for bullies.

Background
In 1788, during the Austro-Turkish War (1787–1791), Koča's frontier rebellion saw eastern Šumadija occupied by Austrian Serbian Free Corps and hajduks, and subsequently, most of the Sanjak of Smederevo was occupied by the Habsburg Monarchy (1788–91). The Siege of Belgrade from 15 September to 8 October 1789, a Habsburg Austrian force besieged the fortress of Belgrade. The Austrians held the city until 1791 when it handed Belgrade back to the Ottomans according to the terms of the Treaty of Sistova. With the return of the sanjak to the Ottoman Empire the Serbs expected reprisals from the Turks due to their support to the Austrians. Sultan Selim III had given complete command of the Sanjak of Smederevo and Belgrade to battle-hardened Janissaries that had fought Christian forces during the Austro-Turkish War and many other conflicts. Although Selim III granted authority to the peaceful Hadži Mustafa Pasha (1793), tensions between the Serbs and the Janissary command did not subside.

In 1793 and 1796 Sultan Selim III proclaimed firmans which gave more rights to Serbs. Among other things, taxes were to be collected by the obor-knez (dukes); freedom of trade and religion were granted and there was peace. Selim III also decreed that some unpopular janissaries were to leave the Belgrade Pashaluk as he saw them as a threat to the central authority of Hadži Mustafa Pasha. Many of those janissaries were employed by or found refuge with Osman Pazvantoğlu, a renegade opponent of Sultan Selim III in the Sanjak of Vidin. Fearing the dissolution of the Janissary command in the Sanjak of Smederevo, Osman Pazvantoğlu launched a series of raids against Serbians without the permission of Sultan Selim III, causing much volatility and fear in the region. Pazvantoğlu was defeated in 1793 by the Serbs at the Battle of Kolari. In the summer of 1797 the sultan appointed Mustafa Pasha on position of beglerbeg of Rumelia Eyalet and he left Serbia for Plovdiv to fight against the Vidin rebels of Pazvantoğlu. During the absence of Mustafa Pasha, the forces of Pazvantoğlu captured Požarevac and besieged the Belgrade fortress. At the end of November 1797 obor-knezes Aleksa Nenadović, Ilija Birčanin and Nikola Grbović from Valjevo brought their forces to Belgrade and forced the besieging janissary forces to retreat to Smederevo.

By 1799, the janissary corps had returned to the sanjak, as they were pardoned by the Sultan's decree.

History

Control of the Belgrade Pashalik
 
On 15 December 1801 Vizier Hadji Mustafa Pasha of Belgrade was killed by Kučuk-Alija, one of the four leading dahije. This resulted in the Sanjak of Smederevo being ruled by these renegade janissaries independently from the Ottoman government, in defiance to the Sultan. The janissaries imposed "a system of arbitrary abuse that was unmatched by anything similar in the entire history of Ottoman misrule in the Balkans". The leaders divided the sanjak into pashaluks. They immediately suspended the Serbian autonomy and drastically increased taxes, land was seized, forced labour (čitlučenje) was introduced, and many Serbs fled the janissaries in fear.

Some Ottoman sipahi and Mustafa Pasha's men plotted, and agreed with Serbian knezes to rise against the Dahije, on a given day. Ammunition was smuggled from the Habsburg Monarchy, some given out to the Serbs, and some hid on the Avala. This first attempt to remove the Dahije, erupting a day early in 1802 in Požarevac, was stopped, and the Dahije continued ruling the pashalik.

The tyranny endured by the Serbs caused them to send a petition to the Sultan, which the dahije learnt of. The dahije started to fear that the Sultan would make use of the Serbs to oust them. To forestall this they decided to execute leading Serbs throughout the sanjak, in the event known as the "Slaughter of the Knezes", which took place in late January 1804. According to contemporary sources from Valjevo, the severed heads of the murdered leaders were put on public display in the central square to serve as an example to those who might plot against the rule of the dahije. This enraged the Serbs, who led their families into the woods and started murdering the subaşi (village overseers) that had been employed by the dahije, and also attacking Ottoman forces. The dahije sent out the most diplomatic, Aganlija, with a strong force to frighten and calm them down, in order to avoid escalation into armed conflict which would be hard for the janissaries to manage, but to no avail.

Uprising

On 14 February 1804, in the small village of Orašac near Aranđelovac, leading Serbs gathered and decided to undertake an uprising, choosing Karađorđe Petrović as their leader. The Serbs, at first technically fighting on the behalf of the Sultan against the janissaries, were encouraged and aided by a certain Ottoman official and the sipahi (cavalry corps). For their small numbers, the Serbs had great military successes, having taken Požarevac, Šabac, and charged Smederevo and Belgrade, in a quick succession. The Sultan, who feared that the Serb movement might get out of hand, sent the former pasha of Belgrade, and now Vizier of Bosnia, Bekir Pasha, to officially assist the Serbs, but in reality to keep them under control. Alija Gušanac, the janissary commander of Belgrade, faced by both Serbs and Imperial authority, decided to let Bekir Pasha into the city in July 1804. The dahije had previously fled east to Ada Kale, an island on the Danube. Bekir ordered the surrender of the dahije, meanwhile, Karađorđe sent his commander Milenko Stojković to the island. The dahije refused, upon which Stojković attacked and captured them, and had them beheaded, on the night of 5–6 August 1804. After crushing the power of the dahije, Bekir Pasha wanted the Serbs to be disbanded, however, as the janissaries still held important towns, such as Užice, the Serbs were unwilling to halt without guarantees. The Sultan now ordered the surroundings pashaliks to suppress the Serbs, realizing the threat. The Serbs sought foreign help, sending a delegation to St. Petersburg in September 1804, which returned with money and promise of diplomatic support. The First Serbian Uprising, the first stage of the Serbian Revolution, had thus begun.

Government
The Janissaries chose four of their leading chiefs (Kučuk Alija, Aganlija, Mula Jusuf and Mehmed-aga Fočić) to rule the sanjak after the murder of Mustafa Pasha. The leaders divided the sanjak into pashaluks.

Legacy
There are many Serbian epic poems regarding the dahija, such as Početak bune protiv dahija ("Start of the revolt against the dahijas"), collected by blind bard Filip Višnjić (1767–1834).

When Bosnian Serb general Ratko Mladić entered Srebrenica on July 11, 1995 during the Bosnian war, he presented the town as a "gift" to the Serbian people, and said "Finally, after the rebellion against the dahije, the time has come to take revenge on the Turks in this region". After this, his men massacred over 8,000 Bosniak men and boys, which marked the climax of the Bosnian genocide.

See also

Ottoman coups of 1807–08

References

Bibliography

Further reading

 (Public Domain)

1800s in Serbia
Ottoman Serbia
Janissaries
First Serbian Uprising
Persecution of Serbs
Rebels from the Ottoman Empire
1800s in the Ottoman Empire